This is a list of tanks and armoured vehicles of the Imperial Japanese Navy (World War II).

Tankettes, light and medium tanks

Type 94 tankette
Type 97 Te-Ke tankette
Type 95 Ha-Go light tank 
Type 2 Ke-To light tank
Type 4 Ke-Nu light tank
Type 89 I-Go medium tank (Chi-Ro)
Type 97 Chi-Ha medium tank
Type 97 ShinHoTo Chi-Ha medium tank (Kai; improved)
Type 1 Chi-He medium tank
Type 3 Chi-Nu medium tank

Amphibious tanks

Type 1 Mi-Sha (a/k/a Type 1 Ka-Mi) amphibious tank (prototype)
Type 2 Ka-Mi amphibious tank
Type 3 Ka-Chi amphibious tank
Type 5 To-Ku amphibious tank (prototype)

Amphibious APC
S B swamp vehicle (prototype)
F B swamp vehicle
Type 4 Ka-Tsu amphibious APC vehicle

Self-Propelled vehicles

Type 1 Ho-Ni I 75 mm SPH
Type 1 Ho-Ni II 105 mm SPH
Type 2 Ho-I gun tank
Type 3 Ho-Ni III gun tank
Type 4 Ho-Ro 150 mm SPH
Type 5 Na-To 75 mm SP AT gun
Type 97 ShinHoTo Chi-Ha Short Barrel 120 mm gun tank
Navy Long Barrel 12 cm Self-propelled gun (Experimental)

Armoured cars
Vickers Crossley armoured car
Type 2592 Chiyoda armored car
Sumida Model P armored car
Type 93 armoured car a/k/a Type 2593 Hokoku, Type 93 Kokusanor or "Type 92" naval armored car

Cars and trucks
Type 95 recon car Mini-truck
Amphibious Truck "Su-Ki"

See also
Imperial Japanese Navy Land Forces

References

External links
History of War.org
Taki's Imperial Japanese Army Page - Akira Takizawa

Imperial Japanese Navy